William G. "Bud" Houghton (November 14, 1908 – October 18, 2001) was an American football coach in Ohio.  He served as the head football coach at the University of Akron from 1948 to 1951, compiling a record of 7–27–1.  Houghton graduated from Ohio Wesleyan University in 1933.  He was an assistant football coach under Paul Brown at Massillon Washington High School in Massillon, Ohio and succeeded him as head coach when Brown moved to Ohio State University in 1941.  Upon resigning as football coach at Akron in 1951, Houghton noted his "poor record" and business opportunities.

Head coaching record

References

1908 births
2001 deaths
Akron Zips football coaches
High school basketball coaches in Ohio
High school football coaches in Ohio
Ohio Wesleyan University alumni
People from Mingo Junction, Ohio